Canarium hirsutum is a tree in the family Burseraceae. The specific epithet  comes from the Latin meaning "bristly", referring to the rough hairs of the fruit.

Description

Distribution and habitat
Canarium hirsutum grows widely in Malesia and is also found in the Caroline Islands and Solomon Islands. Its habitat is mixed dipterocarp forest from sea-level to  altitude.

References

hirsutum
Trees of Malesia
Trees of the Solomon Islands
Flora of the Caroline Islands
Plants described in 1806